Col. William H. Sinclair was an American businessman and union officer. Sinclair's biggest achievement was founding the Beach Hotel in Galveston in 1882, in an effort to increase tourism in the city. The project cost $260,000 USD ($6,279,000 in 2018). Sinclair was an avid baseball enthusiast, convincing stockholders to invest in a Texas League baseball franchise in Galveston. He also served as president of the Galveston City Railroad Company.

Sinclair's wife died in 1895, and in early 1897 Sinclair died in Rochester, NY at age of 58. On January 17, 1897 he was buried at Lakeview Cemetery in Galveston.

References

History of Galveston, Texas
People from Galveston, Texas
Transportation in Galveston, Texas
1838 births
1897 deaths
19th-century American businesspeople